The Unforgiven is a 1960 American Western film directed by John Huston, and starring Burt Lancaster and Audrey Hepburn. Filmed in Durango, Mexico, the supporting cast features Audie Murphy, Charles Bickford, Lillian Gish, John Saxon, Joseph Wiseman, Doug McClure and Albert Salmi. The story is based upon the 1957 novel by Alan Le May, author of The Searchers. Uncommonly for its time, the film spotlights the issue of racism against Native Americans and people who were believed to have Native American blood in the Old West. The film is also known for its problems behind the scenes.

Plot
The Zacharys are a thriving and respected family on the Texas frontier. Father Will Zachary was killed by Kiowa Indians, leaving his oldest son Ben (Burt Lancaster) head of the family. Ben and his mother Mattilda (Lillian Gish) are very protective of Rachel (Audrey Hepburn), who was adopted as an infant; she is doted on by the whole family, including her other brothers Cash (Audie Murphy) and Andy (Doug McClure). The family is supported by their neighbor and Ben's business partner, Zeb Rawlins (Charles Bickford); Zeb's shy son Charlie (Albert Salmi) wants to marry Rachel, which concerns Ben.

During preparations for a cattle drive to Wichita, Kansas, the family is unsettled by the appearance of Abe Kelsey (Joseph Wiseman), who claims that Rachel is Indian by birth. Believing this to be a lie, Ben and Cash engage in a gunfight with Kelsey, killing his horse, but he steals Rachel's beloved white stallion. Later, a group of Kiowa led by Lost Bird appears and offers Ben horses in exchange for handing over Rachel. Lost Bird claims that she is actually his sister, and that an old white man told him so.

Soon after, Charlieto whom Ben has decided to give permission to court Rachelis killed by the Kiowa. In her grief, Charlie's mother accuses Rachel of being a "dirty Injun". Ben leads the ranchers in tracking down Kelsey, and they bring him back to the Rawlins ranch to hang him as a horse thief.

With a noose around his neck, Kelsey tells the gathered ranchers that, on a retaliatory raid against the Kiowa that he led with Will Zachary, he found a baby girl and was about to kill her when Will intervened and took the baby as his own. Kelsey claims that his own son was captured by the Kiowa and ransomed for Rachel's return, but Will refused. Ben intervenes and tells the gathered group the story he knows, that Kelsey's son was actually killed in the fighting, and that Kelsey invented the story and followed them from town to town, poisoning peoples' minds wherever they moved.

Mattilda, driven to the edge by Kelsey's accusations, strikes the horse on which Kelsey is seated, so it runs out from under him, hanging him. Despite protestations that Kelsey was insane, her actions convince Zeb that Kelsey was telling the truth, and he tells Ben to give Rachel to the Kiowa or their partnership will be broken. Ben refuses, and all of the ranchers turn their backs on the Zacharys.

Back at their homestead, Mattilda admits to her family that Will took the Kiowa baby and brought her home to replace an infant daughter they had just lost. Cash, unable to accept an Indian as his sister, abandons the family and spends the night with Georgia Rawlins. The Kiowa return to the Zachary ranch in force, demanding Rachel, who tries to save her family by going over to the Kiowa. To stop her, Ben deliberately breaks the truce by ordering Andy to kill a Kiowa, which touches off a bloody siege. Facing down death, Ben expresses a desire to marry Rachel should they survive. During a break in the fighting, the Kiowa camped nearby play music on their pipes and drums, and the Zacharys play a Mozart composition back on their piano. However, Kiowa riders attack and destroy the piano, resuming the fight.

When the Kiowa stampede cattle over the roof of the house, the family sets it on fire and takes shelter in the root cellar. Mattilda, who had been shot earlier, succumbs to her wounds and dies. Almost out of ammunition, Ben embraces Andy and Rachel, and Rachel and he passionately kiss. Just as the family is about to be overwhelmed, a penitent Cash returns and turns the tide by fighting off the remaining Kiowa. Rachel, protecting a wounded Andy, is confronted by Lost Bird, who enters the house. After a tense moment, she shoots and kills him. With the rest of the tribe gone, Rachel and her brothers exit the house together and watch a flock of geese fly through the sky.

Cast

 Burt Lancaster as Ben Zachary
 Audrey Hepburn as Rachel Zachary
 Audie Murphy as Cash Zachary
 John Saxon as Johnny Portugal
 Charles Bickford as Zeb Rawlins
 Lillian Gish as Mattilda Zachary
 Albert Salmi as Charlie Rawlins
 Joseph Wiseman as Abe Kelsey
 June Walker as Hagar Rawlins
 Kipp Hamilton as Georgia Rawlins
 Arnold Merritt as Jude Rawlins
 Doug McClure as Andy Zachary
 Carlos Rivas as Lost Bird

Production

The Unforgiven was the final Hecht-Hill-Lancaster (HHL) production. It had a projected budget of $3 million, which expanded to $5.5 million. Original screenwriter JP Miller was replaced by Ben Maddow, original director Delbert Mann was replaced by John Huston, and plans for Richard Burton in the role that eventually went to Audie Murphy were stopped when Burton demanded equal billing with Burt Lancaster, which Lancaster refused.

Production was suspended for several months in 1959 after Hepburn broke her back when she fell off a horse while rehearsing a scene. Although she eventually recovered, the accident was blamed for a subsequent miscarriage that Hepburn suffered. According to several published biographies of Hepburn, she blamed herself for the accident and all but disowned the film, although she did complete it when she was well enough to return to work. Hepburn stepped away from acting the next year to give birth to another child, returning to the screen with Breakfast at Tiffany's (1961).

Huston battled with HHL, the production company financing the film, because HHL wanted a more commercial and less controversial film, while Huston wanted to make a statement about racism in America. The result was that neither side received exactly what they had wanted.

Huston's cinematographer of choice, Oswald Morris, was unavailable, causing Huston to not talk to Morris for several years.

John Saxon had signed a three-picture deal with HHL. Scenes featuring Saxon were deleted without the director's consent.

The name "Lost Bird" is applied by some Plains Indian tribes to native children adopted by whites. It was popularized by Zintkala Nuni, a Hunkpapa Lakotah survivor of the Wounded Knee Massacre, taken by Leonard Wright Colby and raised by his wife Clara Bewick Colby, whose widely circulated feminist newspaper The Woman's Tribune carried a column on Zintkala for many years. The Lost Bird Society helps to reunite these adopted children with their birth families.

Reception

In 1968, Stanley Kauffmann of The New Republic described the film as "ludicrous".

See also

 1960 in film
 List of American films of 1960
 List of Western films

References

External links
 
 
 
 
 
 The Unforgiven at Audie Murphy Memorial Site

1960 films
1960 Western (genre) films
1960 romantic drama films
American romantic drama films
American Western (genre) films
Audie Murphy
Durango
1960s English-language films
Films about racism
Films based on American novels
Films based on Western (genre) novels
Films directed by John Huston
Films produced by Burt Lancaster
Films produced by James Hill
Films produced by Harold Hecht
Films scored by Dimitri Tiomkin
Films shot in Mexico
Fratricide in fiction
Norma Productions films
United Artists films
Revisionist Western (genre) films
1960s American films